Monsen is a surname.

People with the surname
Arild Monsen (born 1962), Norwegian cross-country skier.
Fredrik Monsen (1878–1954), Norwegian politician.
Gabriel Monsen (1798–1882), Norwegian politician.
Georg Monsen (1922–2015), Norwegian football player.
Lars Monsen (born 1963), Norwegian journalist.
Lloyd Monsen (born 1931), American soccer and baseball player.
Magdalon Monsen (1910–1953), Norwegian football player.
Marie Monsen (1878–1962), Norwegian Christian missionary.
Mogens Larsen Monsen (1727–1802), Norwegian timber trader.
Nina Karin Monsen (born 1943), Norwegian philosopher.
Ole Monsen Mjelde (1865–1942), Norwegian politician.
Otto Monsen (1887–1979), Norwegian track and field athlete.
Per Monsen (1913–1985), Norwegian editor.
Per Erik Monsen (1946–2008), Norwegian politician.
Randi Monsen (1910–1997), Norwegian illustrator.
Rolf Monsen (1899–1987), American Olympic skier.

See also
Monson (disambiguation)